Israel Rodríguez (born 16 November 1960) is an Ecuadorian footballer. He played in eleven matches for the Ecuador national football team from 1983 to 1985. He was also part of Ecuador's squad for the 1983 Copa América tournament.

References

External links
 

1960 births
Living people
Ecuadorian footballers
Ecuador international footballers
Place of birth missing (living people)
Association football goalkeepers